The Dolore is a French river in the Auvergne region. It originates in the monts du Livradois and joins the Dore, left bank; hence it is a sub-affluent of the Loire.

Geography 
The Dolore originates at Fournols, in the Livradois range.
It flows southward until Saint-Bonnet-le-Chastel. It then turns east, before joining the Dore, left bank, downstream of Arlanc.

The entire river valley is part of the Livradois-Forez Regional Natural Park.

Communes 
Heading downstream, the river fares through : 
 Fournols, Chambon-sur-Dolore, Saint-Bonnet-le-Chastel, Novacelles, Saint-Sauveur-la-Sagne, Mayres, Arlanc.

Affluents 
 Ruisseau des Moches
 Ruisseau du Forestier
 Ruisseau de la Farge (sometimes charted 'la Palle')
 Ruisseau de la Queue
 Ruisseau des Palles
 Ruisseau des Mons
 Ruisseau de la Combe
 Ruisseau de Beligeon

Hydrology 

The river has well-marked seasonal debital variations. These monthly scores can also however vary yearly or over short periods.

The average debit hence reached 16.8 L/s/km².

Ecology 
Lush in trout, a fair part of the river is included in the Natura 2000 programme, a small colony of Freshwater pearl mussel still present.
Though it suffers little from industrial, domestic or agricultural pollution, the resinous reforestation of its banks has led to acidification of its waters and spawn clogging.

References 

Rivers of Auvergne-Rhône-Alpes
Rivers of France
Rivers of Puy-de-Dôme